Viktor Gennadievich Khrenin is a senior leader in the Belarusian Armed Forces and the current Minister of Defense.

Life and career
He was born on 1 August 1971 in Navahrudak, a town in the Grodno Region. His father, Gennady Khrenin, was a Soviet Army Colonel in Reserve from the Penza Oblast. He graduated in 1988 from the Minsk Suvorov Military School. After graduating from the Omsk-based Frunze Higher Combined Arms Command School in 1992, he served as a platoon commander and later a battalion commander in the 6th Guards Kiev-Berlin Mechanised Brigade. After graduating from the Military Academy of Belarus in 2005, Khrenin served as a senior officer in the operational department of the headquarters of the Western Operational Command. After leaving this post, he took a number of leadership positions that climaxed when he became the commander of the 11th Guards Berlin-Carpathian Mechanized Brigade. In 2014, he graduated from the faculty of the General Staff of the Belarusian Military Academy with honours and a gold medal. On 23 June 2015, by decree of President Alexander Lukashenko he was appointed to the post of commander of the troops of the Western Operational Command.

Defence minister

After 5 years in this role, he was appointed in January 2020, by President Lukashenko, to the post of the Defence Minister of Belarus, succeeding Lieutenant General Andrei Ravkov, who himself was made the State Secretary of the Security Council of Belarus. Upon his appointment, he underlined his consistency with military priorities while admitting that he "will have to study and learn a lot".

On the 80th birthday of Anatoly Kostenko, Khrenin personally congratulated the former defence minister in the building of the military department.

During the 2020 Belarusian protests, he compared those marching and protesting under the historical tricolor of the short-lived Belarusian People's Republic to Nazi collaborators during World War II, saying in a statement that "We cannot calmly watch how, under the flags under which the fascists organized the massacres of Belarusians, Russians, Jews, [and] representatives of other nationalities, actions are being organized today in these sacred places". His statement was considered to be unusually politicized and emotionally charged even for an agency like the defense ministry. Khrenin also declared to the military leadership that a military conflict may be unfolding that will require their assistance.

Sanctions
In June 2021, the EU put sanctions on Khrenin. He was also sanctioned by the United Kingdom, Switzerland, Canada, and the United States.

On 25 March 2022, Khrenin was sanctioned by Australia due to having "played a role of significant strategic importance to Russia by allowing Russia to launch attacks from Belarus" in the 2022 Russian invasion of Ukraine.

Personal life
Wife - Natalya Mikhailovna Khrenina, the head of the physiotherapy department of the 1134th Military Clinical Medical Center of the Armed Forces.
Daughter - Marina, a lawyer and a graduate of the Yanka Kupala State University of Grodno.

Awards
Order "For Service to the Motherland" III degree
Medal "For impeccable service" I degree (2018)
Medal "For impeccable service" II degree
Medal "For impeccable service" III degree
Jubilee Medal "50 years of Victory in the Great Patriotic War 1941-1945"
Jubilee Medal "60 years of the liberation of the Republic of Belarus from the Nazi invaders"
Jubilee Medal "60 years of Victory in the Great Patriotic War 1941-1945"
Medal "65 years of the liberation of the Republic of Belarus from the Nazi invaders"
Jubilee Medal "65 years of Victory in the Great Patriotic War 1941-1945"
Jubilee Medal "70 years of the liberation of the Republic of Belarus from the Nazi invaders"

References

1971 births
Living people
People from Navahrudak
Defence ministers of Belarus
Government of Belarus
Minsk Suvorov Military School alumni
Specially Designated Nationals and Blocked Persons List